Jocks is a 1987 teen comedy.  The film was directed by Steve Carver and written by Michael Lanahan and David Oas.
Jocks was shot in Las Vegas and in Los Angeles.

Plot

Coach Williams (Richard Roundtree) must get his tennis players into shape for the big play-offs in Las Vegas. The Kid (Scott Strader) and his buddies run wild in Vegas on and off the court as the coach tries to keep the players out of trouble before the match. Christopher Lee and R. G. Armstrong appear in character roles with Mariska Hargitay in the role of the heroine, Nicole.

Cast
 Scott Strader as The Kid
 Perry Lang as Jeff
 Mariska Hargitay as Nicole
 Richard Roundtree as Chip Williams
 R. G. Armstrong as Coach Bettlebom
 Stoney Jackson as  Andy
 Adam Mills as Tex
 Donald Gibb as Ripper
 Tom Shadyac as Chris
 Christopher Murphy as Tony
 Katherine Kelly Lang as Julie
 Christopher Lee as President White
 Trinidad Silva as Chito
 Marianne Gravatte Woman On The Jocks Poster
 Faith Minton as Big Woman In Bar (uncredited)

Production
The film was originally known as Road Trip. It was an early appearance by Mariska Hargitay who said the producer wanted her to do a nude sequence but she refused. "They compromised a little and I compromised a little", she said. "Originally my part had a little bit of nudity but I don't do nudity."

Reception

Box office 
Jocks was released in 1987 but never received a wide release.  The film grossed only $120,808, making it one of the larger box office failures of 1987.

Critical response 

For the most part, the film was either ignored or attacked by critics.  David Cornelius of DVD talk.com gave the film a negative review saying,

The script is rambling and forgetful ... its characters lack the very charm the movie is convinced it's oozing, the tennis sequences are maddeningly dull, the romance is vacant. This is the kind of movie that thinks it's a blast because it shows us college kids getting drunk and leering at women, not realizing that you need to put in these things called "jokes" to make such a premise work.

References

External links
 
 
 

1987 films
American sexploitation films
Crown International Pictures films
1980s teen comedy films
American teen comedy films
Tennis films
Teen sex comedy films
1980s English-language films
1980s American films
Films directed by Steve Carver